| tries = {{#expr:
 + 8 + 9 + 5 + 7 + 6 + 5
 + 7 + 12 + 5 + 8 + 9 + 5
 + 5 + 7 + 8 + 11 + 7 + 12
 + 10 + 13 + 9 + 5 + 6 + 5
 + 9 + 10 + 11 + 11 + 11 + 4
 + 11 + 6 + 12 + 8 + 7 + 7
 + 7 + 5 + 8 + 7 + 15 + 11
 + 4 + 6 + 9 + 9 + 9 + 4
 + 8 + 12 + 5 + 6 + 8 + 4
 + 8 + 9
 + 4 + 10 + 10 + 8 + 10 + 4
 + 7 + 7 + 6
 + 4 + 4 + 4 + 6 + 8 + 6
 + 7 + 8 + 5 + 8 + 5  
 + 10 + 9 + 7 + 6 + 6 + 7
 + 10 + 11 + 12 + 8 + 7 + 13
 + 7 + 8 + 7 + 3 + 10

}}
| top point scorer   = 156 – William Maisey (Bedford Blues)
| top try scorer     = 14 – Carlo Trizzano (Ealing Trailfinders)  
| prevseason         = 2021–22
| nextseason         = 2023–24
}}

The 2022–23 RFU Championship is the fourteenth season of the RFU Championship, the professional second tier of rugby union in England. It features eleven English teams and one from Jersey. Ealing Trailfinders are the reigning champions.

Structure
The twelve teams will play each of the other teams twice. 

The results of the matches contribute points to the league as follows:
 4 points are awarded for a win
 2 points are awarded for a draw
 0 points are awarded for a loss, however
 1 losing (bonus) point is awarded to a team that loses a match by 7 points or fewer
 1 additional (bonus) point is awarded to a team scoring 4 tries or more in a match.

Promotion and relegation
Subject to meeting the minimum standards criteria the team finishing top of the league will be promoted to Premiership Rugby, which means there will be no relegation to National League 1. If the champions do not meet the criteria, and therefore not promoted, one team will be relegated. With both Wasps and Worcester Warriors entering administration and possible relegation to the championship, the number of teams in next seasons competition is uncertain and could consist of 12, 13 or 14 teams.

On 13 February 2023, the RFU confirmed that only Doncaster Knights were eligible for promotion.

RFU funding
For the third year in a row, each club will receive approximately £161,500 in funding from the RFU, as part of the reduction of funding introduced ahead of the 2016–17 season. Following news of the funding change, several clubs announced a switch to a semi-professional business model ahead of the 2020–21 season.

Teams
Eleven of the twelve teams played in last season's competition. Having won the 2021–22 National League 1, Caldy were promoted to the Championship. Owing to there being only eleven teams in the Championship last season there was no relegation.

Table

Fixtures & results
Fixtures for the season was announced by the RFU on 24 June 2022.

Round 1

Round 2

Round 3

Round 4

Round 5

Round 6

Round 7

Round 8

Round 9

Round 10

Round 11

Rescheduled matches (Round 10)

Round 12

Round 13

Round 14

Round 15

Round 16

Round 17

References

 
2
RFU Championship seasons
2